Sarrkkar: Rishton Ki Ankahi Kahani is a political family drama that aired on Zee TV in 2005–2006.

Penned by Shobhaa De, the serial was produced by Siddhant Cinevision. The initial family structure in the series held a resemblance to Gandhi family, according to some.

Cast 
 Divya Seth as Priyamvada Veerpratap Singh
 Rajat Kapoor as Veerpratap Singh, Priyamvada's Husband & Kunal, Karan, Kritika's Father
 Ronit Roy as Kunalpratap Singh
 Rohit Roy as Karanpratap Singh
 Tisca Chopra as Urvashi, Kunal's wife
 Shweta Salve as Shweta, Karan's wife
 Mouli Ganguly as Kritika, Priyamvada and Veerpratap's daughter
 Manav Gohil as Laksh Pandit, Urvashi's childhood friend
 Sandeep Rajora as Sudhanshu, Kritika's husband 
 Manini Mishra as Yaana
 Kanika Kohli as Natasha, Karanpratap's friend
 Govind Namdev
 Amar Talwar
  Shakti Singh
  Tarun Khanna
 Anju Mahendru
 Gajendra Chauhan
 Abir Goswami
 Shama Deshpande
 Zeb Khan
 Tara Mehta
 Abhay Bhargava
 Gopi Desai

References 

Zee TV original programming
Political drama television series
2005 Indian television series debuts
2006 Indian television series endings
Indian political television series